The Taking of Chelsea 426 is a BBC Books original novel written by David Llewellyn and based on the long-running British science fiction television series Doctor Who. It features the Tenth Doctor without an official companion. It was released on 3 September 2009, alongside Autonomy and The Krillitane Storm. This book features Sontarans and Rutans.

Synopsis
The Doctor arrives for a flower show on Chelsea 426, a human colony of Saturn. However, he notices many of the local shopkeepers acting oddly. Then the Sontarans show up. They are not fans of flowers.

Audiobook
An unabridged audiobook was released in April 2010, read by Christopher Ryan, who played several Sontaran characters in the television series.

See also

 Whoniverse

References

External links
 
 The Cloister Library - The Taking of Chelsea 426

2009 British novels
2009 science fiction novels
New Series Adventures
Novels by David Llewellyn
Tenth Doctor novels